Howald, a town in the commune of Hesperange, Luxembourg.

Howald or Houwald may also refer to:

Howald (surname)
Houwald family, a German noble family

See also
Hohwald
Howaldt family